Rosette is an unincorporated ranching community in northwestern Box Elder County, Utah, United States.

Description

The community was named by the town's first postmaster, Jonathan Campbell, in 1871. The name refers to the wild roses in the area.

Climate
According to the Köppen Climate Classification system, Rosette has a semi-arid climate, abbreviated "BSk" on climate maps.

See also

References

External links

Unincorporated communities in Box Elder County, Utah
Unincorporated communities in Utah
Populated places established in 1871
1871 establishments in Utah Territory